Soyuz TMA-16M was a 2015 flight to the International Space Station. It transported three members of the Expedition 43 crew to the Station. TMA-16M was the 125th flight of a Soyuz spacecraft, the first having launched in 1967.

Scott Kelly and Mikhail Korniyenko performed the first one-year stay at the Space Station, returning in Soyuz TMA-18M.

Crew

Backup crew

Mission highlights

Launch, rendezvous and docking
Soyuz TMA-16M was launched successfully aboard a Soyuz-FG rocket from the Baikonur Cosmodrome in Kazakhstan at 19:42 UTC on Friday, 27 March 2015. The spacecraft reached low Earth orbit approximately nine minutes after lift-off. After executing rendezvous maneuvers, the Soyuz docked with the zenith port of the International Space Station's Poisk module approximately six hours after launch, at 01:33 UTC on 28 March. The docking occurred over Colombia.

Soyuz TMA-16M remained docked to the ISS—serving as an emergency escape vehicle–until 12 September 2015, when it departed and returned Padalka, Andreas Mogensen and Aydyn Aimbetov to Earth. This vehicle was previously scheduled to carry Sarah Brightman as a space tourist, but Brightman's flight was announced to be cancelled in May 2015.

Relocation maneuver
Soyuz TMA-16M spacecraft was relocated from Poisk module to the orbiting laboratory's Zvezda module service module on 28 August 2015. This cleared the Poisk module for the arrival of Soyuz TMA-18M.

Undocking and return to Earth
Soyuz TMA-16M undocked from the ISS at 21:29 UTC on 11 September 2015, containing Gennady Padalka of Roscosmos and visiting crew members Andreas Mogensen of ESA (European Space Agency) and Aidyn Aimbetov of the Kazakh Space Agency. Following a deorbit burn, the Soyuz spacecraft's descent module reentered the Earth's atmosphere. The crew landed safely in Kazakhstan at 00:51 UTC on 12 September 2015, just over three hours after departing the ISS.

Gallery

References

External links 
 

Crewed Soyuz missions
Spacecraft launched in 2015
2015 in Russia
Spacecraft which reentered in 2015
Spacecraft launched by Soyuz-FG rockets